FYN binding protein (FYB-120/130), also known as FYB, ADAP (Adhesion and degranulation-promoting adapter protein), and SLAP-130 (SLP-76-associated phosphoprotein) is a protein that is encoded by the FYB gene in humans. The protein is expressed in T cells, monocytes, mast cells, macrophages, NK cells, but not B cells. FYB is a multifunctional protein involved in post-activation T cell signaling, lymphocyte cytokine production, cell adhesion, and actin remodeling.

Structure 
Two isoforms of FYB with different lengths of 120 and 130 kDa (FYB-120 and FYB-130) exist. The 130kDa version has an extra insertion of 46 amino acids and is preferentially expressed in peripheral T cells. The FYB protein has a variety of binding domains: a non-structured N-terminal region, a proline-rich region, two SH3 domains, a FPPP-motif which binds the ENA/VASP protein family, and other tyrosine-based signaling motifs.

Function 
FYB is critical for activation and proliferation of T-helper cells (CD4+) and required for chemokine signal transduction in T-helper cells and cytotoxic T cells (CD8+).

FYB regulates cytokine production in T cells as well as in activated NK cells through the FYN-ADAP axis. In T cells, after TCR stimulation, a unique region of FYB, pYDGI, allows phosphorylation of the protein by FYN. After being phosphorylated, ADAP can bind to Carma1, causing NF-κB translocation into the nucleus and cytokine production.

In mast cells, FYB regulates cell adhesion as well as degranulation. In T cells, FYB allows for cell adhesion and migration through blood vessels through the SLP-76-FYB-SKAP1 complex. After being phosphorylated by FYN, FYB can bind to SLP-76. This binding of FYB and SLP-76 regulates "outside-in signaling" or the transfer of signals from outside the cell to inside the cell by integrin. FYB can also bind to SKAP1, which allows SKAP1 to upregulate integrin activity through interactions with Rap1. The bacteria Yersinia can interfere with this pathway in macrophages through the secretion of  YopH (Yersinia protein tyrosine phosphatase) into the macrophage, which de-phosphorylates FYB and SKAP1, leading to a decrease in integrin activity that results in an inhibition of adhesion, phagocytosis, and cytotoxicity.

FYB is also an important protein for actin remodeling of immune cells. This is thought to occur through the binding of proteins of the ENA/VASP protein family to the FPPPP-motif of the FYB protein.

References

Further reading